Section 8 of the New York State Public High School Activities Association (NYSPHSAA) is a governing body for high school sports in Nassau County, New York. It is also known as Nassau County Public High School Athletic Association.

Schools
A
A
 Farmingdale High School
 Freeport High School
 Hempstead High School
 Massapequa High School
 Oceanside High School
 Syosset High School
 Uniondale High School
A
 Baldwin Senior High School
 East Meadow High School
 General Douglas Macarthur High School
 Herricks High School
 Hicksville High School
 John F Kennedy High School, Plainview
 Paul D. Schreiber Senior High School
B
A
 Calhoun High School
 Great Neck South High School
 H. Frank Carey Junior-Senior High School
 John F Kennedy High School, Bellmore
 Long Beach High School
 Valley Stream Central High School
 WC Mepham High School
B
 Division Avenue High School
 Elmont Memorial High School
 Garden City High School
 George W. Hewlett High School
 Jericho High School
 New Hyde Park Memorial High School
 Roslyn High School
C
A
 Lawrence High School
 Plainedge High School
 Sewanhaka High School
 South Side High School
 Wantagh High School
 West Hempstead High School
 Westbury High School
C
 Bethpage High School
 Floral Park Memorial High School
 Glen Cove High School
 Great Neck North High School
 Island Trees High School
 Lynbrook Senior High School
 Valley Stream South High School
D
A
 Locust Valley High School
 Manhasset High School
 Mineola High School
 North Shore High School
 Roosevelt High School
 Seaford High School
 Valley Stream North High School
 W T Clarke High School
D
 Carle Place High School
 Cold Spring Harbor High School
 East Rockaway High School
 Friends Academy
 Malverne High School
 Oyster Bay-East Norwich High School
 The Wheatley School

References

Organizations based in New York (state)
High school sports associations in the United States
Sports governing bodies in the United States
New York State Public High School Athletic Association sections